The 2023 Malaysia M3 League is the 4th season of Malaysia M3 League, the second tier football league in Malaysia, since its establishment in 2019. The season started on 4th March.

Establishment and format
This new season saw the format restructuring by the Amateur Football League (AFL). On 19 January 2020, the AFL has announced the format changes for the Malaysia M3 League and Malaysia M4 League in preparation for the transition of the amateur team to semi-professionals by 2021.

The league will kick-off with 14 teams into one single group of league. The top four teams will play in the play-offs to determine which teams will qualify for promotion to the Super League in the 2024 season. The bottom two teams will be relegated to the M4 League.

Clubs
As of 29 December 2022, 14 clubs confirmed their participation in the 2023 Malaysia M3 League.

 Armed Forces
 Bukit Tambun
 BRM
 Harini Selangor
 Immigration
 Kuala Lumpur Rovers
 Malaysian University
 Manjung City
 Melaka
 Naga UKS
 Perlis United
 PIB Shah Alam
 SAINS
 Sarawak United

Season changes

Renamed clubs 

 Ultimate was renamed to Naga Ultimate Kuala Selangor FC (Naga UKS).

Ejected from the 2023 Malaysia Super League
 Sarawak United

New Team
 Melaka

Teams withdrawn
 Kinabalu Jaguar
 Respect

Relegated to the 2023 Malaysia M4 League

 FC Langkawi
 Kijang Rangers
 Langkawi City
 Real Chukai
 Tok Janggut Warriors
 Tun Razak City

Clubs locations

Venues

Personnel and sponsoring

League table

Position by round

Result table

Season statistics

Top scorers

Hat-tricks

Notes
4 Player scored 4 goals
5 Player scored 5 goals
(H) – Home team(A) – Away team

Clean Sheets

See also 
 2023 Malaysia Super League
 2023 Malaysia FA Cup

References

External links
 Football Association of Malaysia website - M3 League

2023 in Malaysian football
Malaysia M3 League seasons